Gang of Eight may refer to:

Politics
 Gang of Eight (intelligence), leaders within the U.S. Congress for intelligence matters
 Gang of Eight (fiscal matters), leaders within the U.S. Congress for fiscal matters
 Gang of Eight (immigration), leaders within the U.S. Senate who wrote the 2013 immigration bill
 Gang of Eight (Soviet Union), officials who attempted a coup against Mikhail Gorbachev
 Gang of Eight, Canadian premiers who opposed Pierre Trudeau's proposed Charter of Rights and Freedoms during patriation

Other uses
 The Gang of Eight, a 1962 Mexican-Spanish film